NRIC may refer to:

National Railway Infrastructure Company, Bulgaria's state-owned railway infrastructure company
National Registration Identity Card, the identity document in Singapore
Malaysian identity card, the identity document of Malaysia also known as National Registration Identity Card